Hammersmith Academy is a non-denominational, all-ability, co-educational secondary academy for 11- to 18-year-olds specialising in creative and digital media and information technology, located in the London Borough of Hammersmith and Fulham, West London, England.

Opened in September 2001, the Academy is jointly sponsored by the Worshipful Company of Mercers (the oldest livery company in the City of London) and the Worshipful Company of Information Technologists (the 100th Livery Company).

The academy is based in a four-storey building which has facilities such as a Theatre, Sports Hall, Library, Fitness Suite and Digital Editing & IT suites.

Background

In 2006, only 38% of local children in the London Borough of Hammersmith and Fulham went to local state schools. This led the council to launch its Schools of Choice programme which aimed to provide more choice to meet the growing demand for school places in the borough and reduce the need for parents to send their children to schools outside of Hammersmith and Fulham.

Plans were later announced in 2007 for the building of a new academy within the borough which would be sponsored by the Mercers' Company and the Information Technologists Company. The new academy would open in September 2010 and be designed to accommodate up to 780 mixed ability students aged 11–18, with the site of the former Stamford House young offenders selected.

The opening was later pushed back to September 2011 and building work began in June 2009. It was founded by Tom Ilube, a British-Nigerian entrepreneur and educational philanthropist.

Facilities

The building encompasses:
 Large Learning Bases which provide flexible teaching areas for student groups
 Science Laboratories designed and equipped to provide large areas of accessible space for practical work
 Whiteboard technology in all teaching areas
 Independent Learning Centres with full access to online resources
 Library
 Video and Music editing space complete with green-screen and a radio station
 Two large technology workshops served by Computer Aided Design and Computer Aided Manufacture.
 Dance/Drama Studio with sprung floors and full length mirrors
 Theatre with tiered seating
 Multi Use Games Area and 250m running track
 Fitness Suite.
 Multi-purpose Sports Hall.
Sen department

Ofsted

 The Academy was rated as 'Good' with some 'Outstanding' features in its first Ofsted inspection despite being open less than 18 months.

Year structure
The new year structure goes. L,A,J,M,K. L for Lovelace, A for  Attenborough, J for Johnson, M for McQueen and K for Khan. The new houses refer to the inspirational people Such as the mathematician Ada Lovelace, The biologist David Attenborough, The NASA mathematician Katherine Johnson, The film director Steve McQueen (director) and the architect Khan. These will be the houses for all the years from Year 7-13.

GCSE Options

Mandatory 

 Science 
 Maths 
 English 
 Spanish 
 RE 
 PE ( Physical )
 Either Geography or History

Optional 

 Art
 Computer Science 
 Design Technology
 Drama 
 Economics 
 Media studies 
 Music 
 PE ( Theory )
 Triple Science

*Students that know other languages other than Spanish are able to do that as a GCSE #

Famous Visits 
In 2015 Prince William visited Hammersmith academy for an anti-bullying campaign known as the Princess Diana anti-bullying campaign, The campaign focused on Cyber-bullying and LGBTQ+ bullying. Another famous visit was in the January of 2022 when the education secretary Nadhim Zahawi  was invited for a tour around the academy, later on the BBC news he had positive opinions on the academy.

References

External links
 

2011 in London
2011 establishments in England
Educational institutions established in 2011
Academies in the London Borough of Hammersmith and Fulham
Digital media schools
Secondary schools in the London Borough of Hammersmith and Fulham
Academy